Gondwana Records is an independent record label based in Manchester, UK. The label was founded in 2008 by Matthew Halsall to shine a light on the talent Matthew heard in the local clubs. In 2012 Gondwana Records signed the then unknown Manchester-based piano trio, GoGo Penguin releasing their debut album Fanfares and in the decade since have gone on to also release records by Allysha Joy, Caoilfhionn Rose, Chip Wickham, Dwight Trible, Forgiveness, Hania Rani, Jasmine Myra, John Ellis, Mammal Hands, Halsall, Nat Birchall, Noya Rao, Paradise Cinema, Phil France, Phi-Psonics, Portico Quartet, STUFF., Sunda Arc, Svaneborg Kardyb and Vega Trails. 

Gondwana has grown into an international record label with offices in Berlin, London and Manchester and working with artists from America, Australia, Belgium, Poland and the United Kingdom.

In 2018, Gondwana celebrated its tenth anniversary with a series of performances and festivals in Tokyo, Berlin, Brussels and London.

References

External links

British record labels